Schlamme is a surname. Notable people with the surname include:

 Martha Schlamme (1923–1985), Austrian-born American singer
 Thomas Schlamme (born 1950), American television director and producer

See also
 Schlamelcher

German-language surnames
Jewish surnames